Rockin' in the Rockies is a 1945 musical Western full-length movie starring the Three Stooges (not to be confused with their 1940 short subject Rockin' thru the Rockies). The picture was one of the Stooges' few feature-length films made during the run of their better-known series of short subjects for Columbia Pictures, although the group had appeared in supporting roles in other features. It is the only Stooges feature-length film with the team's best known line-up (Moe Howard, Larry Fine, and Curly Howard) in starring roles.

Plot
While his cousin Rusty Williams (Jay Kirby) is away at Agricultural College, prospector Shorty (Moe) fills in at Rusty's struggling Reno, Nevada spread as the ranch foreman. He spends his time looking for an angle at the Wagon Wheel Cafe Casino, and hooks up with two vagrants (Larry and Curly) after they accidentally win big at roulette. Along with two stranded New York singers (Mary Beth Hughes, Gladys Blake) and their money, the Stooges and the girls head for the ranch with prospecting plans. Rusty returns home with hope that investor Sam Clemens (Forrest Taylor) will save the ranch's cattle and mining operations, and finds Shorty and the gang's plans interfering. Complicating matters further, inept ranch hands (The Hoosier Hotshots) mistake Clemens for a cattle rustler, and Shorty, Curly and Larry cook up a scheme to get the girls an audition with a vacationing Broadway producer (Tim Ryan).

Cast
 The Three Stooges as Themselves
 Moe Howard as Shorty Williams (Ranch Foreman) (as The Three Stooges)
 Larry Fine as Larry (a Vagrant) (as The Three Stooges)
 Curly Howard as Curly (a Vagrant) (as The Three Stooges)
 Mary Beth Hughes as June McGuire
 The Hoosier Hotshots as Ranch Hands / Musicians
 Ken Trietsch as Hotshot Ken (as The Hoosier Hotshots)
 Paul Trietsch as Hotshot Hezzie (as The Hoosier Hotshots)
 Charles Ward as Hotshot Gabe (as The Hoosier Hotshots)
 Gil Taylor as Hotshot Gil (as The Hoosier Hotshots)
 Jay Kirby as Rusty Williams
 Cappy Barra Boys as Harmonica Musicians
 Gladys Blake as Betty Vale
 Tim Ryan as Tom Trove
 Spade Cooley as Spade Cooley (as Spade Cooley King of Western Swing)
 Forrest Taylor as Sam Clemens (uncredited)

Production and reception
Rockin' in the Rockies featured musical numbers by Western Swing orchestra Spade Cooley and the Hoosier Hot Shots. The Hoosier Hotshots were comedic musicians but, unlike Spike Jones' orchestra, their country-swing music never hit mainstream playlists and they are relatively unknown today.

Oddly, Moe plays straight man as a non-Stooge character, with Larry and Curly interacting as a comedy duo. Curly is relatively subdued, as his mannerisms and reactions were starting to slow down by this time. Filmed on December 1–22, 1944, shortly after Idiots Deluxe, Curly (who noticeably played trombone in both films) was a few short weeks away from suffering a minor stroke, one that would hamper his remaining time with the Stooges. In addition, his falsetto voice sounds hoarse and strained.

As a result of Moe being cast separately from the team, Larry awkwardly assumes Moe's role as leader of the duo. As author Jon Solomon put it, though the Stooges do give the film "all the energy they can muster ... when the writing divides them into a duo and a solo, they lose their comic dynamic."

Solomon continues:
"Rockin' in the Rockies ignored many of the ingredients that were making contemporary Stooge short-films so successful. Writers Johnny Grey and J. Benton Cheney, who had barely written for the Stooges before, separated the Stooges and left Moe to act solo, including very few slapstick exchanges, and omitted an effective foil whom the Stooges could abuse or frustrate. At one point, Moe has words with and almost strangles Betty (Gladys Blake) ... 
 Moe: "Jasper, [the mule] and I are alike in a lot of things."
 Betty: "Only your ears are shorter."
 Moe: "I resemble that last remark!"

 ... which is exactly the sort of personnel combination in which the Stooges do not succeed. Normally the Stooges either rescue a damsel in distress or are beaten up by tough, ugly, or overweight women. Here, instead of a heroic rescue or a slapstick exchange, Moe has to pull back his hands. Betty has no verbal or physical comeback, but later she gives Moe a kiss. This film may headline the Stooges, but it is not a Stooge film.

Either the writers/director (Vernon Keays) did not understand what the Stooges were all about or they consciously tried to create a new kind of vehicle for them. Characterizing Moe and Curly as wiseguy tricksters fails because the writers were unable to make them either tricky or clever liars. Often in their mid-career feature films the Stooges are called upon to 'do' their old gags and cram as many of them as possible into a few minutes, but here they simply recycle old gags without the kind of improvements Time Out for Rhythm achieved, and the dialogue is so limited that although the stag, horse and mule all talk, they actually have very little to say. Larry and Curly speak in uncharacteristically courteous dialogue as they mount the horse, and at one point the creativity is so lacking Moe calls Curly merely, 'You silly so-and-so.'

Even the sound effects are anemic or inappropriate. For the physical gags Curly's ailing health is apparent, and Moe is rarely around to cover for or interact with him. This leaves Larry as the toughie — not his best persona. Larry even has to run the 'when-I-say-go-we-all-point-to-the-right' routine. When Curly and Larry finally mount the horse, when Larry rides on top of Curly, and when Larry uses a sledgehammer on Curly's head, there is a real absence of either franticness or even the basic Stoogeness that makes them elsewhere so successful.

Ultimately, the entertainment in Rockin' in the Rockies derives from its wacky and upbeat musical acts."

Rockin' in the Rockies was not a success, and the Stooges continued their series of shorts, again with occasional supporting roles in others' feature films. The group eventually achieved some feature film success with a series of full-length pictures made during a television-fueled resurgence after Columbia had ended their series of shorts. Beginning with 1959's Have Rocket, Will Travel, these later films starred Moe, Larry, and Joe DeRita, who joined the group after the deaths of both Curly and Shemp Howard and the departure of comedian Joe Besser.

References

External links
 
 
 
 

1945 films
The Three Stooges films
1940s Western (genre) comedy films
1940s musical comedy films
American black-and-white films
Columbia Pictures films
American Western (genre) comedy films
American musical comedy films
Films directed by Vernon Keays
1940s Western (genre) musical films
American Western (genre) musical films
1945 comedy films
1940s English-language films
1940s American films